Gerald D. Irons Sr. (May 2, 1947 – April 1, 2021) was an American professional football player who played ten seasons in the National Football League (NFL). His youngest son Grant Irons played for the Oakland Raiders. Eldest son Gerald, Jr. played for the Nebraska Cornhuskers and middle son Jarrett was the fifth junior elected captain for the Michigan Wolverines.  He had several nephews and great-nephews who have played in the NFL, David Irons, Kenny Irons and Paul Irons.  Gerald has been listed among the 100 greatest Cleveland Browns of all time.

Education
Irons earned his Bachelor of Science Degree in business administration from the University of Maryland Eastern Shore (formerly Maryland State College). During his time in college,he was captain of the football team, Student Government Association vice-president, and a member of the Fellowship of Christian Athletes, and joined Kappa Alpha Psi fraternity. In 1984, he was inducted into the UMES Football Hall of Fame.

He earned a master's degree in business administration from The University of Chicago over six off-seasons, while playing professional football as a linebacker for the Oakland Raiders.

He attended Cleveland Marshall College of Law at night, while playing linebacker with the Cleveland Browns for four years. Cleveland, Ohio Jaycees named him “Man of the Year.”

Life after football
After ten years in the NFL, he retired from football and moved his family to Texas.  Five years after arriving in Texas, the Osaka Japan Jaycees selected him to represent the United States at its worldwide “Ten Outstanding Young Persons Conference,” held for 10 days in Osaka.  During the conference, he met with the Crown Prince, Crown Princess, and Prime Minister. The Mayor of Osaka presented him with a gold key to the city of Osaka. He was fluent in Japanese.

Irons was a Past President of the Conroe Independent School District Board of Trustees.  He served on the CISD Board for over two decades.

He was a sought-after motivational speaker, a graduate of the Houston FBI Citizens Academy, community board member of Texas Children’s Hospital and Memorial Hermann Hospital.

Professional life 

After retiring from football, Gerald transitioned from the gridiron to the business world.  He worked for 32 years with The Woodlands Development Company, a division of the Howard Hughes Corporation, located in The Woodlands, Texas, a 30,000-acre master planned community. As the Vice President of Business Development, Gerald led the relocation of hundreds of companies to The Woodlands. He became Sr. Vice President of Business Development.

He was also on the field during the immaculate reception watching Franco Harris score the game winning touchdown in a huge playoff game.

Personal life
Irons was married for 50 years to Myrna.  They have raised three sons, all graduates of Conroe ISD high schools. All five members of The Irons Family were selected and honored by The Woodlands residents as "Original Hometown Heroes" at The Woodlands 25th Year Celebration.

Irons retired after 22 years of service of the CISD School Board, and a school, Gerald D. Irons, Sr. Junior High School, was named in his honor. The school, a feeder school for Oak Ridge High School, opened in August 2012 near Conroe.

Irons was an Elder and Founding Member of Impact Church of The Woodlands.

Death
After a battle with Parkinson's Disease, Gerald D. Irons, Sr., died on April 1, 2021 in The Woodlands, TX surrounded by his family.

References

External links
Conroeisd

1947 births
2021 deaths
Players of American football from Gary, Indiana
African-American players of American football
American football linebackers
Maryland Eastern Shore Hawks football players
Oakland Raiders players
Cleveland Browns players
Sportspeople from the Chicago metropolitan area
School board members in Texas
20th-century African-American sportspeople
21st-century African-American people
Irons family (American football)